Behren-lès-Forbach (literally Behren near Forbach) is a commune in the Moselle department in Grand Est in northeastern France. Between 1812 and 1925, it was part of the commune of Kerbach.

Population

See also
 Communes of the Moselle department

References

External links

 Official site

Communes of Moselle (department)